Girolamo Starace (1785) was an Italian painter of the late-Baroque period, active mainly in Naples.

Life
He trained under Francesco de Mura. Among his works are the decoration of the stairwell of the Royal Palace of Caserta and in the palace of marchese Berio

References

1696 births
1782 deaths
18th-century Neapolitan people
18th-century Italian painters
Italian male painters
Painters from Naples
Italian Baroque painters
18th-century Italian male artists